Zhivago Duncan is a contemporary artist currently based in Mexico City. His works range from paintings, sculpture and mixed media to substantial installations including complex, mesmeric mechanical fantasies.

Early years
Born in Terre Haute, Indiana in 1980, son of Michael Duncan and Sadie Duncan. His life has been itinerant, and he has lived in many different countries including the US, UK, Malta, France, and Germany. Zhivago speaks six languages fluently.

Education
He studied at the Chelsea School of Art, London, graduating in 2007.

Collections
Collections include the Saatchi Gallery, where he has exhibited in the major Gesamtkuntswerk exhibition of new art from Germany. Zhivago has also exhibited in the UK and Germany. He has an unabashed approach to his work and colleagues. On a recent approach to Bruno Brunett, director of leading Berlin gallery Contemporary Fine Arts at an art fair the artist introduced himself with "I’m Zhivago Duncan. Someone told me you’re the only man with the balls to sell my work."

Gallery
According to the Saatchi gallery, one of the world's leading collections of modern art, "through his sprawling, messy multimedia artworks, Zhivago Duncan comments on the state of contemporary culture and its obsessions, crassly quoted and re-created from an irreversibly apocalyptic future point of view".

Zhivago himself comments: "my work provides a close examination of our society’s excessive infatuation with glamour, fortune, and fame." His work is not one-dimensional, however. According to the Cat Street Gallery, "rather than existing solely as a contemporary commentator, Zhivago also brings an element of historical voyeurism to his pieces, even sometimes nostalgia. Whether expressive silk-screened portraits of celebrities long forgotten or sculptural remnants of abandoned muscle cars, his aesthetic of damage and tarnish pays homage to the countless icons that have been lost in the depths of time."

Personal
Zhivago's multi-faceted character is reflected in his habitation of a variety of creative alter egos who inspire and create his work. One of these was "Nacnud Ogavihz" a reversal of the label of his own identity. In 2010-11 his works consisted of paintings and installations created by "Dick Flash".
Dick Flash's work is "the result of the imaginary journey of Dick Flash, the world’s sole survivor of the apocalypse according to him and his legacy. Semi-amnesiac, Dick Flash roams the converted world digging up the fruitful remains of his debauched ancestors."

References

External links 
 Artist Zhivago Duncan Gives INTERVIEW 15 Minutes of Fame, Interview Magazine, December 17, 2009 
 Zhivago Duncan at CFA Berlin, Aesthetica Magazine, February 21, 2011
 Zhivago Duncan, Artsy.net
 Zhivago Duncan, Saatchi Gallery 
 Zhivago Duncan: Pretentious Crap, Perez Art Museum Miami

American artists
Living people
Year of birth missing (living people)